USS R-18 (SS-95) was an R-class coastal and harbor defense submarine of the United States Navy.

Construction and commissioning
R-18′s keel was laid down on 16 June 1917 by the Union Iron Works in San Francisco, California.  She was launched on 8 January 1918, sponsored by Miss Marion S. Russell, and commissioned on 11 September 1918.

Service history

1918–1931

Following shakedown, R-18 was assigned, briefly, to the Panama Canal Zone. At the end of 1918 she returned to California. She was at San Pedro, California, from January to March 1919, then underwent an overhaul at San Francisco. On 17 June 1919 she got underway for Hawaii and on 25 June 1919 she arrived there at Pearl Harbor. Based there for over a decade, she served with the United States Pacific Fleet, training personnel and testing new submarine equipment. On 17 July 1920 she was given the hull classification symbol SS-95.

R-18 departed Hawaii on 12 December 1930, transited the Panama Canal, and thence continued on to the United States East Coast for inactivation. Arriving at Philadelphia, Pennsylvania, on 9 February 1931, she was decommissioned on 13 May 1931 and berthed at League Island.

1941–1946
Recommissioned 8 January 1941, R-18 was at New London, Connecticut, for reconditioning and fitting out into May 1941. On 12 May 1941 she got underway for the Panama Canal Zone, where she patrolled into September 1941. In October 1941 she returned to New London, underwent an overhaul, and then conducted training exercises in submarine warfare and anti-submarine warfare. In early January 1942, she shifted her training activities to the Casco Bay, Maine, area. Then, later January 1942, she added patrols along a line between Nantucket Light and Bermuda to her schedule.

Originally patrolling from New London, she shifted to Bermuda in May 1942. On 30 May 1942, a U.S. Navy OS2U-2 Kingfisher floatplane mistook her for a German U-boat and dropped a depth charge on her as she crash-dived in the Atlantic Ocean  bearing 50 degrees from Bermuda′s Mount Hill Lighthouse. R-18 sustained no damage. In August 1942 she moved farther south and until December 1942 operated in a training capacity in the United States Virgin Islands and at Trinidad.

Then assigned with other R-class submarines to training duties for the remainder of World War II, R-18 returned to New London on 24 December 1942. She operated in the New London and Portland, Maine, areas until June 1943. She was at Bermuda from July to December 1943. From January through March 1944, she was back in southern New England. In April 1944 she moved south for eight months at Key West, and Port Everglades, Florida.

In 1945, R-18 again began operations from New London. During the summer of 1945 she made her last voyage to Florida and back and in September 1945 she headed for New Hampshire and inactivation. R-18 arrived at Portsmouth, New Hampshire, on 7 September 1945 and was decommissioned on 19 September 1945. Struck from the Naval Vessel Register in October 1945, she was sold for scrapping to the John J. Duane Company of Quincy, Massachusetts, in 1946.

References

Footnotes

Bibliography
 Hinman, Charles R., and Douglas E. Campbell. The Submarine Has No Friends: Friendly Fire Incidents Involving U.S. Submarines During World War II. Syneca Research Group, Inc., 2019. .

External links
 

R-18 (SS-95)
World War I submarines of the United States
World War II submarines of the United States
Ships built in San Francisco
1918 ships
Maritime incidents in May 1942
Friendly fire incidents of World War II